Campbeltown was a royal burgh that elected one Commissioner to the Estates of Scotland between 1700 and 1707.

Campbeltown in Kintyre was erected a royal burgh by charter of King William II on 19 April 1700, at the request of the Earl of Argyll.

The first and only Commissioner for the burgh was Mr Charles Campbell, who took his seat on 2 November 1700. He was Lord Argyll's brother, and represented the burgh from 1700 to 1702 and in the last Parliament from 1703 to 1707.

Following the Act of Union 1707, Campbeltown was represented in the Parliament of Great Britain as part of the Ayr district of burghs.

List of burgh commissioners

 1700–02, 1702–07: Charles Campbell

See also
 List of constituencies in the Parliament of Scotland at the time of the Union

References

Burghs represented in the Parliament of Scotland (to 1707)
Politics of Argyll and Bute
History of Argyll and Bute
1700 establishments in Scotland
Kintyre
Campbeltown
Constituencies established in 1700
Constituencies disestablished in 1707
1707 disestablishments in Scotland